Liberty City may refer to:

Places
Liberty City (Miami), a neighborhood of Miami
Liberty City, Texas, a census-designated place in Gregg County

Media
Liberty City, a fictional city based on New York City, in the Grand Theft Auto video game series
Grand Theft Auto: Liberty City Stories, an installment of the Grand Theft Auto computer and video game series

Other uses
"Liberty City", a composition by Jaco Pastorius from his 1981 album, Word of Mouth

See also
Liberty, Kansas, in Montgomery County
Liberty, Kentucky, in Casey County
Liberty, Missouri, in Clay County
Liberty, Texas, county seat of Liberty County